The Erramala are a range of low hills in southern India, in Kurnool district of Andhra Pradesh state. The Erramala hills lie on the Deccan plateau, running east–west and dividing the basin of the Penna River to the south from the basin of the Krishna River to the north. The hill range may be extended along the Penna River basin in Kadapa district.

Some important visitor attractions along the Erramala Hills are as follows:
 Belum Caves
 Yadiki Caves
 Yaganti
 Gandikota
 Kalva Bugga
 Kolimigundla
 Tadipatri
 Orvakal Rocks
 Kethavaram Rock art site
 Banaganapalli
 Owk

To the east lies the higher Nallamalla Hills.

Gallery

References

Hills of Andhra Pradesh
Eastern Ghats
Geography of Kurnool district